Warrior is the debut and only full-length album by American rock band Scandal (billed on the album as "Scandal featuring Patty Smyth"). The album reached a high of #17 on the U.S. Billboard Hot 200 album chart on the strength of the lead single "The Warrior". In 2014, an expanded and remastered edition was released, which included as bonus tracks the five songs from 1982's Scandal (EP).

Track listing

Charts

Personnel
Scandal
 Patty Smyth - lead vocals
 Zack Smith - guitar, background vocals
 Ivan Elias - bass guitar
 Keith Mack - guitar, background vocals
 Thommy Price - drums, background vocals

Additional musicians
 Peter Wood - synthesizer
 Pat Mastelotto - drums ("Only the Young")
 Andy Newmark - drums ("Less than Half") +
 Franke Previte - background vocals ("Hands Tied")
 Norman Mershon - background vocals ("Hands Tied")

+ On the album, it states that Andy Newmark played drums on the song "Hands Tied"; however, drum aficionados believe he actually plays on the song after, "Less Than Half" instead, since the complicated rhythm pattern replicates a technique/style that he commonly uses.

Production
Mike Chapman - producer
John Agnello, David Alhert, Carol Cafiero, John Davenport, Eddie Garcia, Dave Hernandez, Greg Mack, William Wittman, Gene Wooley - engineering
John Davenport, William Wittman, David Alhert, Gene Wooley - mixing
LP dead-wax reads "A Disgusting Pile Of Guts" on the A-side. The B-side reads "I Like That About Myself"

Chart performance
The album spent 41 weeks on the U.S. Billboard album charts and reached its peak position of #17 in early October 1984.

References

External links
 Discogs.com - The Warrior entry

1984 debut albums
Scandal (American band) albums
Albums produced by Mike Chapman
Columbia Records albums